Sohan is a village and union council of Jhelum District in the Punjab Province of Pakistan. It is part of Jhelum Tehsil, and is located at 33°3'25N 73°26'30E with an altitude of 303 metres (997 feet). Most of the population belong to the Panhwar Sohlan Rajputs.

References

Populated places in Tehsil  Pind Dadan Khan
Union councils of Pind Dadan Khan Tehsil